The French Broad River is a river in the U.S. states of North Carolina and Tennessee. It flows  from near the town of Rosman in Transylvania County, North Carolina, into Tennessee, where its confluence with the Holston River at Knoxville forms the beginning of the Tennessee River.  The river flows through the counties of Transylvania, Buncombe, Henderson, and Madison in North Carolina, and Cocke, Jefferson, Sevier, and Knox in Tennessee. It drains large portions of the Pisgah National Forest and the Cherokee National Forest.

Course
The headwaters of the French Broad River are near the town of Rosman in Transylvania County, North Carolina, just northwest of the Eastern Continental Divide near the northwest border of South Carolina.  They spill from a 50-foot waterfall called Courthouse Falls at the terminus of Courthouse Creek near Balsam Grove. The waterfall feeds into a creek that becomes the North Fork, which joins the West Fork west of Rosman. South of Rosman, the stream is joined by the Middle and East forks to form the French Broad River. 

From there it flows northeast through the Appalachian Mountains into Henderson, and Buncombe counties.  In Buncombe County, the river flows through the city of Asheville, where it receives the water of the Swannanoa River.  Downstream of Asheville, the river passes north through Madison County, where the county seat, Marshall, developed along the river. After passing through the mountain resort of Hot Springs in the Bald Mountains, the river enters Cocke County, Tennessee.

In Cocke County, the river passes through the community of Del Rio, and receives the waters of both the Pigeon and the Nolichucky rivers northwest of Cocke's county seat, Newport. Near Sevierville, at Kodak, the French Broad River receives the flow of the Little Pigeon River, which drains much of the Tennessee section of the Great Smoky Mountains. After flowing through a wide gap in Bays Mountain, it enters Knox County. Its confluence with the Holston River forms the Tennessee River at a place known as "Forks of the River", at the eastern edge of present-day Knoxville.

Major tributaries
 North Fork
 West Fork
 East Fork
 Middle Fork
 Pigeon River
 Nolichucky River
 Mills River
 Davidson River
 Swannanoa River
 Little River (French Broad River)

History
The French Broad River is believed to be one of the oldest in the world, cutting over geologic eons through ancient rocks in the Southern Appalachian Mountains. However, the current topographic relief of the Southern Appalachians is relatively new, making it virtually impossible to estimate the age of the river.

The nearby Broad River was originally named the "English Broad River".

The Cherokee people, the historic Indigenous Americans who occupied this area at the time of European encounter, referred to the river by different names: Poelico and Agiqua ("broad") in the mountains of the headwaters; Zillicoah upriver of the confluence at present-day Asheville;   and Tahkeeosteh (racing waters) from Asheville downriver. The river is considered to roughly mark the eastern boundary of the Cherokee homelands in this region, which included areas of present-day northwestern South Carolina, northeastern Georgia, and southeastern Tennessee. The French called the river the Agiqua, borrowing one of the Cherokee names.

Initiated as a project during the administration of President Franklin D. Roosevelt, Douglas Dam was completed in the 1940s on the lower French Broad by the Tennessee Valley Authority (TVA) to provide electricity and flood control. It is one of the larger TVA developments on a tributary of the Tennessee River. (The two other very large ones are Norris Lake on the Clinch River and Cherokee Lake on the Holston River.)

The paddle trail is a part of the North Carolina State Trails System, which is a section of the NC Division of Parks and Recreation. A system of launch point sites was created along the river to support the trail.

The portion of the French Broad River in Tennessee was designated as a state scenic river by the Tennessee Scenic Rivers Act of 1968. Approximately  of the river in Cocke County, starting at the North Carolina border and extending downstream to the place where it flows into Douglas Lake, are designated as a Class III, Partially Developed River.

Crossings
The following is a partial list of crossings of the French Broad from Brevard to the confluence with the Tennessee River.

North Carolina
Transylvania and Henderson counties
Patton Bridge
Crab Creek Road
Blantyre Road
Etowah School Road in Etowah
McLean Bridge (U.S. 64) in Etowah
Johnson Bridge
Fannings Bridge
Butler Bridge
Kings Bridge (N.C. 191)
Boylston Highway (N.C. 280) at the Asheville Regional Airport
Buncombe County/Asheville
Glenn Bridge
Long Shoals Road (N.C. 146) in Skyland
Blue Ridge Parkway
Interstate 26
Interstate 40 at the Biltmore Estate
Carrier Bridge in Asheville
Haywood Road in Asheville
Smith Bridge in Asheville
Bowen Bridge (Interstate 26/I-240/U.S. 19/U.S. 74) in Asheville
Pearson Bridge in Asheville
Old Leicester Highway in Craggy
Fletcher Martin Road
Madison County
Two Bridges connecting Marshall to Blannahasset Island
Little Pine Road
Barnard Road in Barnard (put-in for Section 9 of the French Broad, a Class III-IV whitewater run that is the most frequently paddled section of the river)
(U.S. 25)/(U.S. 70) in Hot Springs (takeout for Section 9); the Appalachian Trail crosses this bridge.

Tennessee
Cocke County
Wolf Creek Bridge
Bridge in Del Rio
James T Huff Bridge (U.S. 25/U.S. 70)
U.S. 321 in Newport
Holt Town Road
U.S. Route 25E from Cocke County into Jefferson County)
Douglas Lake to Knoxville
Interstate 40 and Swann Bridge (U.S. 70) over Douglas Lake
James D. Hoskins Bridge in Dandridge
Douglas Dam Road
TN 66 at Sevierville
Several golf cart path bridges over the Cain Islands
Doctor JH Gammondale Bridge in Marbledale

Further reading
Wilma Dykeman wrote the book The French Broad (1955) about the river. The book brought public attention to concerns about the polluted condition of parts of the river.  The river is also the subject of the monograph Watershed: The French Broad River (2012) by Jeff Rich.

See also
List of North Carolina rivers
List of Tennessee rivers
Wilma Dykeman RiverWay Plan (for RiverLink's sustainable greenways and park developments on/near the French Broad River)

References

External links

French Broad Riverkeeper, conservation group that monitors water quality in the French Broad Watershed. 
RiverLink, regional conservation group
French Broad River State Trail, official website for the state paddle trail.

 
Rivers of Buncombe County, North Carolina
Rivers of Henderson County, North Carolina
Rivers of Madison County, North Carolina
Rivers of North Carolina
Rivers of Tennessee
Rivers of Sevier County, Tennessee
Rivers of Cocke County, Tennessee
Rivers of Jefferson County, Tennessee
Rivers of Knox County, Tennessee
Water trails